Janaka Kumbukage (ජනක කුඹුකගේ) [Sinhala]), is an actor in Sri Lankan cinema, stage drama and television. Highly versatile actor primarily engaged in television, Kumbukage is notable for his roles in films Saroja, Daruwane and Udumbara.

Personal life
He has one younger brother. His father and mother are retired teachers. He studied at more than five schools due to parents' transfers. He studied at Wadduwa Madya Maha Vidyalaya, where his interest in drama has grown. He completed his A/L education in the commerce stream. Before entering drama, he entered Technical College, Maradana and studied Business Studies for four years. While involved in drama, he also worked in Milk Board. He is married to Anusha, where the wedding was celebrated in 1994. The couple has one son.

Career
In 1984, Kumbukage started his drama career under the guidance of Gamini Haththotuwegama’s dramatic workshops and then became a member of his Street Drama Group. He also worked with Dharmasiri Bandaranayake, Somalatha Subasinghe, Asoka Handagama and German playwright Klauz Coozemberg in many stage plays while in street dramas. In 2000 he won the award for the best Stage Actor for the play Beehama Buhumi in State Drama Festival. His maiden television acting came through Siva Rahasa Pura directed by Wimalarante Adikari.

In 2009, he directed his maiden stage play Sulanga Mata Katha Karai. It was staged on July 25 and 26 at Lumbini Theatre, Colombo. Kumbukage started his film career with Sihina Deshayen back in 1996, directed by Boodee Keerthisena.

Notable theater works

 Paadada Asapuwa
 Hel Tamba
 Suwishalapura
 Sayanaye Sihinaya
 Mama Kamathima Chocolate – Meya Asa Biscuit
 Ashawe Vidi Riya
 Kema Lasthi
 Eka-Adhipathi
 Mamai Aanduwa
 Makaraakshaya
 Dhawala Bheeshana
 Adaraneeya Sanwadayak
 Handa Eliyata Wedi Thiyanna 
 Puthra Samagama
 Nonawaru Samaga Mahathwaru
 Jana Mithura
 Kolamba Paara
 Banku Weeraya
 Jayasirita Pissu
 Sudarshi
 Debidi Bro

Notable television works

 Acid
 Adaraneeya Niagara
 Aeya
 Anantha Sihinaya 
 Aparna
 Apayata Giya Gamanak
 Bhoomarangaya
 Bus Eke Iskole
 Devana Warama 
 Dhawala Yamaya
 Divithura
 Diyawadana Maluwa
 Duvili Maliga
 Ekas Ginna
 Esala Kaluwara
 Hiru Dahasak Yata
 Hiru Thaniwela Ahase
 Holman Bottuwa
 Hopalu Arana
 Ilandariyo 
 Ingammaruwa
 Isiwara Asapuwa
 Itu Devi Vimana
 Katu Kurullo 
 Kutu Kutu Mama
 Liyagala Mal
 Mal Pipena Kale
 Malee
 Maya Agni
 Maya Mansala
 Mehew Rate
 Monaravila
 Namal Arana
 Nenalaa<ref>{{cite web |url=http://www.sarasaviya.lk/teledramas/2020/09/24/19033/නාලන්ගේ-නෑනලා-රූපවාහිනියට-එති |title=Nalan's 'Nenala come on TV |publisher=Sarasaviya |access-date=24 September 2017}}</ref>
 Nil Mal Viyana 
 Nisala Vilthera Paata Paata Minissu Pembara Maw Sanda Podu 
 Poori Pura Sakmana Ranga Soba Rangamadala Samugani Rathriya Romeo And Dante Sadgunakaraya 
 Sadisi Tharanaya 
 Sakee Salsapuna'
 Sanda Ginigath Rathriya 
 Sanda Kinduru
 Sapirivara
 Sasaraka Ima
 Sasara Seya
 Sihina Piyapath
 Sinansenna Anuththara 
 Siva Rahasa Pura
 Snehaye Daasi
 Sudu Gindara
 Sulangata Madivee
 Swarna Veena 
 Tharuka 
 Tharu Kumari
 Tharumalee
 Thisara Peraliya
 Thodu
 Vasudha 
 Vinivindimi
 Wansakkarayo

Filmography

Awards and accolades
He has won several awards at the local stage drama, television and film festivals.

Sumathi Awards

|-
|| 1996 ||| Isiwara Asapuwa || Best Upcoming Actor ||

Presidential Film Awards

|-
|| 2000 ||| Saroja || Best Actor ||

State Drama Festivlals

|-
|| 2000 ||| Beehama Buhumi || Best Actor || 
|-
|| 2013 ||| Adaraneeya Sanwadayak || Best Actor ||

References

External links
 Janaka turns to stage play

Sri Lankan male film actors
Sinhalese male actors
Living people
Year of birth missing (living people)